ABC Records was an American record label founded in New York City in 1955. It originated as the main popular music label operated by the Am-Par Record Corporation. Am-Par also created the Impulse! jazz label in 1960. It acquired many labels before ABC was sold to MCA Records in 1979. ABC produced music in a variety of genres: pop, rock, jazz, country, rhythm and blues, soundtrack, gospel, and polka. In addition to producing records, ABC licensed masters from independent record producers, and purchased regionally released records for national distribution.

The label was initially called Am-Par Records (1955), but quickly changed to ABC-Paramount Records (1955–1966), and then renamed ABC Records in 1966.

History

Background
In the 1940s and early 1950s, the Federal Communications Commission took action against the Anti-competitive practices of movie studios and broadcasting companies, forcing the Radio Corporation of America (RCA) to sell the Blue Network, the sister network of NBC Red Network, in 1943. The Blue Network was purchased by Edward J. Noble, who changed the company's name to the American Broadcasting Company (ABC) in 1946. In 1953, ABC merged with United Paramount Theatres, the divested former exhibition/cinema division of Paramount Pictures, with the newly-merged corporation, American Broadcasting-Paramount Theatres (AB-PT) chaired by former Paramount Theaters executive Leonard Goldenson and headquartered at 1501 Broadway in New York City, above the Paramount Theater in Times Square.

ABC-Paramount Records

By August 1955, the unit was organized with AMPCO (ASCAP) and PAMCO (BMI) as subsidiary publishing units. Though the record label was established as Am-Par, no records were released until after the division's name was changed to ABC-Paramount in September 1955.

Eydie Gorme was the company's first signed artist. The company recorded its first single record, "Sincerely Yours" and "Come Home", both by Gorme. Alec Templeton's "Smart Alec" was the company's first LP recorded, also in September 1955.

One of Gorme's singles was its first release in January 1956. "Chain Gang" by Bobby Scott in February 1956 was the company's first national hit. George Hamilton IV's "A Rose and a Baby Ruth" single was Am-Paramount's first million-selling single in October 1956.

In 1957, the company had two million-selling single in June with "Diana" by Paul Anka and in October with "At the Hop" by 
Danny & the Juniors. Am-Paramount Records in May 1958 debut the Apt subsidiary label with its first million-selling single, "Little Star" by the Elegants, released the same month.

Chancellor Records had Am-Par Record Corporation handle its distribution starting in 1957 and started a trend. Chancellor had its first million-selling single in October 1958 with Lloyd Price's "Stagger Lee".

Am-Par purchased Grand Award Records including the newly formed Command Records label, in 1959. The company started a second label for jazz, Impulse! Records, in November 1960. Impulse released its first four records in January 1961.

The company had artists that earned three Grammy Awards in 1960. While in January 1961, the company purchased Westminster Records, a classical label. Thus Am-Par Record had a label for each music genre.

Am-Par Record Corporation was renamed to ABC-Paramount Records, Inc. on December 7, 1961. The company opened a Los Angeles office in January 1962. Ray Charles formed Tangerine Records in March 1962 and arranged for ABC-Paramount to distribute Tangerine's records. The company formed Jet Record Distributors based in Long Island City, N.Y. as its local distributor. Also in 1962, the company had acquired Music Guild label and library for Westminster Records.

In 1965, Clark was promoted to vice-president in charge of AB-PT's non-broadcast operations. National sales manager Larry Newton was named ABC-Paramount president. On January 4, 1965, vice-president in charge of sales Larry Newton was promoted to president of ABC-Paramount Records. The previous president, Sam Clark was promoted to director of theater operations for American Broadcasting-Paramount Theatres. Newton's first action as president was to restart Apt Records as a teen-oriented West Coast base label under Irwin Garr.

ABC Records
In June 1966, the label was renamed ABC Records, and the company acquired New Deal Record Service Corp., a rack-jobbing and record distribution company, along with its affiliates.

In 1967, Dunhill Records was purchased from Lou Adler. In 1970, ABC and Dunhill moved its headquarters to Los Angeles. Newton was promoted to vice-president in charge of ABC Pictures. Dunhill co-owner Jay Lasker was named president and referred to the combined operations as ABC/Dunhill. At that time ABC had another five labels: Westminster, Command, Probe, Impulse, and Bluesway.

At the August 29, 1970 Directors Guild meeting, ABC/Dunhill launched a number of marketing initiatives. The company planned to have writers create a broader music for the catalog market. Imprints Probe and Apt were relaunched, Probe as an label which held the international rights to ABC's albums and Apt as a label which released budget cassettes and 8-track tapes. Jazz dropped from Impulse's cover for a new slogan: "University Series of Fine Recording" and two new series were launched: Audio Treasury and Westminster Gold for classic and youth fare respectively.

By May 1972, ABC formed the ABC Leisure Group, which included ABC Records, Anchor Records, and ABC Records and Tape Sales, plus a new retail record-store division. Lasker left ABC to join Ariola America Records in 1975. He was succeeded by Jerry Rubinstein, who served as company head until 1977. In November 1972, ABC bought country music company Cartwheel Records.

In 1974, ABC switched British distribution from EMI to the EMI-distributed Anchor Records, allowing ABC recordings to be issued on the ABC label in the UK, and Anchor records to be distributed by ABC on the Anchor label in the US. Also in 1974, ABC acquired Famous Music Records Group including Nashville based Dot Records then began releasing ABC country music under the ABC/Dot label until January 1979.

As a cost-cutting measure, ABC Records discarded many master tapes in the 1970s to save storage space. When these recordings were reissued on compact disc in the 1980s, CD versions were often taken from master copies which had less than optimal sound quality. The company's last president, Steve Diener, was named to that job in 1977 after serving as head of ABC Records' international division. Because of financial problems except for its Nashville office, ABC Records was sold on January 31, 1979 to MCA Records with ABC Records being its third label likely under a different name. Instead, MCA discontinued ABC Records on March 5, 1979 and albums in the ABC catalog still selling well were reissued on MCA.

Diener died in April 2019, aged 80.

Acquisitions
ABC Records sub-labeled Apt to release singles. In the early 1960s, it bought Westminster, a classical music label. For jazz it created Impulse!. Led by Creed Taylor and Bob Thiele, Impulse! developed a reputation for innovative releases, including albums by John Coltrane from 1961 until his death in 1967. ABC created Bluesway for blues music. Tangerine was formed by Ray Charles to produce his albums and those he produced.

ABC Records bought Dunhill in the summer of 1967, forming ABC Dunhill Records. It also bought Don Robey's record labels, including Duke, Peacock, Back Beat, and Song Bird on May 23, 1973.

In 1974 ABC bought the Famous Music record labels from Gulf and Western, the parent company of Paramount. This acquisition gave ABC Dot, Blue Thumb, and a distribution deal with Sire, which released the first album from the Ramones.

ABC purchased all labels from Enoch Light in October 1959. It acquired Audition, Command, Colortone, and Waldorf Music Hall.

In 1979, ABC was acquired by MCA for $30 million. It operated briefly as a separate division. MCA was absorbed by the Universal Music Group, which currently distributes recordings for ABC's current sister company, Disney Music Group, worldwide except for Russia.

This is not the same ABC Records that operates in Australia, which is run by the Australian Broadcasting Corporation, although the Ampar label was distributed in Australia in the 1950s and 1960s, first by W&G Records (1955–60) and then by Festival. Nor is it the sub-label of Voiceprint.

ABC-Paramount/ABC Records label variations
 1955–1961: Black label, "ABC-PARAMOUNT" around top perimeter of label in yellow, red, and blue (repeating in that sequence) Venus medium font, with silver print for singles and the company's name in all white letters in Venus medium and silver print for albums and logo consisting of color spectrum Möbius strip and white jagged line (representing a sound wave). Bottom perimeter of label reads: "A PRODUCT OF AM-PAR RECORD CORP."
 1961–1966: Same label as above, but disclaimer at bottom of label now reads: "A PRODUCT OF ABC-PARAMOUNT RECORDS, INC."
 1966–1967: Label name now shortened to ABC Records. Black label with large white circle at top with "abc" in black letters and the "Möbius strip and sound wave" logo under the letters. This variant was used only for singles.
 1967–1974: Black label with small white "abc" circle logo in color spectrum box at top (In conjunction with this label, a brief interim label was used from 1973 to 1974 consisting of three children's blocks spelling out ABC and one block with the "abc" logo in a white triangle at the top).
 1974–1978: Yellow, orange, red and purple "sunburst" label with "abc Records" (black "abc" circle logo) between two black lines at top. (Note: The other ABC labels would also adopt this label, such as Dunhill, Dot, Blue Thumb with its logo next to the "abc" logo, and Backbeat and Impulse with a green background rather than a yellow background, but the circles were the same.)
 1978–1979: Same multi-colored label as above, but with 1/8 note featuring "abc" inside the bottom of the note. Late pressings show "Mfg. & Dist. by MCA Distributing Corp..." at the bottom perimeter, just before the ABC label was discontinued and its artists transferred to MCA.

Artists associated with ABC Records and its labels

 Amazing Rhythm Aces
 Paul Anka
 Louis Armstrong
 The Atlantics
 Kevin Ayers
 Florence Ballard
 Count Basie
 Cliff Bennett and the Rebel Rousers (US/Canada)
 Joe Bennett and The Sparkletones
 Stephen Bishop
 Art Blakey
 Blood, Sweat & Tears
 Bobby Bland
 The Brass Ring
 Tom Bresh
 Charles Brown
 Roy Brown
 Jimmy Buffett
 Solomon Burke
 Shirley Collie
 Carl Carlton
 Betty Carter
 Johnny Carver (musician)
 Ray Charles
 Kvitka Cisyk
 Roy Clark
 Ornette Coleman
 John Coltrane
 John Conlee
 Billy "Crash" Craddock
 Jim Croce
 Crosby and Nash
 Crowfoot
 The Crusaders
 Danny & the Juniors
 Dalton and Dubarri
 James Darren
 Billy Davis Jr.
 The Del-Vikings
 The Dells
 Fats Domino
 Bo Donaldson and the Heywoods
 The Dramatics
 The Dubs
 Duke and the Drivers
 The Elegants
 Lu Elliott
 Mario Escudero
 Donna Fargo
 Narvel Felts
 Freddy Fender
 Ferrante & Teicher
 Mickie Finn's
 The Floaters
 Frank Fontaine
 Four Tops
 Ferrante & Teicher
 The 5th Dimension
 Lefty Frizzell
 Gabriel (band)
 Genesis (US/Canada)
 Eydie Gormé
 The Grass Roots
 George Hamilton IV
 Bobby Hammack
 Christian Harmonizers
 Richard Harris (US/Canada)
 Coleman Hawkins
 Isaac Hayes
 Roy Head
 Hello People
 Levon Helm
 Lawrence Hilton-Jacobs
 Eddie Holman
 John Lee Hooker
 Freddie Hubbard
 James Gang
 The Impressions
 Jackie and Roy
 Johnny Kidd and the Pirates (US/Canada)
 B.B. King
 Kracker
 Frankie Laine
 Julius La Rosa
 Denise LaSalle
 Yusef Lateef
 Steve Lawrence
 J B Loyd
 Eddie Lund
 Barbara Mandrell
 The Mamas and the Papas
 Barry Mann
 Charles Mann
 Shelly Manne
 Guy Marks
 The Marvelows
 Marilyn McCoo
 Brownie McGhee
 Barry McGuire
 Mighty Clouds of Joy
 Charles Mingus
 The O'Kaysions
 The Oak Ridge Boys
 Tommy Overstreet
 Pavlov's Dog
 Paxton Brothers
 Poco
 The Pointer Sisters
 The Poni-Tails
 Lloyd Price
 Rare Bird
 Jimmy Reed
 Emitt Rhodes
 Rhythm Heritage
 Cliff Richard (US/Canada)
 Sue Richards
 Howard Roberts (Impulse!)
 Tommy Roe
 Sonny Rollins
 Jeris Ross
 Royal Teens
 Rufus featuring Chaka Khan
 Jimmy Rushing
 John Wesley Ryles
 Sabicas
 Soupy Sales
 The Sapphires
 Bobby Scott
 Jack Scott
 Shirley Scott
 The Shadows (US/Canada)
 Archie Shepp
 Beverly Sills
 Smith (featuring Gayle McCormick)
 Soft Machine (Probe/ABC)
 Otis Spann
 Arnold Stang
 Dusty Springfield (US/Canada)
 Joe Stampley
 Red Steagall
 Silk
 Steely Dan
 Diane Steinberg
 Steppenwolf
 Stepson
 Sonny Terry
 B. J. Thomas
 Three Dog Night
 Buck Trent
 Joe Turner
 US Radio Band
 Eddie Vinson
 Bobby Vinton
 T-Bone Walker
 Joe Walsh
 Wha-Koo
 Josh White
 Chico Williams
 Lenny Williams
 Jimmy Witherspoon
 Bobby Wright
 O. V. Wright
 The Ziontones

Labels associated with ABC Records

 20th Century Fox Records
 Addison Records
 Anchor Records
 Apt Records
 Back Beat Records
 Bigtop Records
 Blue Thumb Records
 Bluesway Records
 Boom Records
 Buluu Dunhill Records
 Chancellor Records
 Cimarron Records
 Colonial Records
 Command Records
 Dot Records
 Duke Records
 Dunhill Records
 Equinox Records
 Fargo Records
 Grand Award Records
 GTO Records
 Hickory Records
 Hot Buttered Soul Records
 Hunt Records
 Impulse! Records
 Jerden Records
 LHI Records
 Montel Records
 Myrrh Records
 Oliver Records
 Passport Records
 Peacock Records
 Probe Records
 Senate Records
 Shelter Records
 Sire Records
 Song Bird Records
 Tangerine Records
 Westminster Records
 Wren Records

Management of ABC Records catalog today
The catalogs of ABC Records and its sub-labels are now controlled by Universal Music Group. UMG also distributes Disney Music Group, which is owned by ABC's current parent, The Walt Disney Company, with the following exceptions:
 The Paul Anka ABC-Paramount catalog is controlled by Anka himself. Distribution is done by Universal Music Enterprises and its Canadian counterpart UMusic.
 The Jim Croce catalog is controlled by the Croce estate and R2M Music, and is distributed by BMG Rights Management.
 The Ray Charles catalog is controlled by the Charles estate and is currently licensed to Concord Records. Concord's recordings are distributed by UMG.
 The Amazing Rhythm Aces catalog and the recordings that former 5th Dimension members Marilyn McCoo and Billy Davis Jr. made for ABC are controlled by Sony Music.
 Lawrence Welk acquired his Dot recordings (prior to ABC acquiring the label) which were reissued on his Ranwood Records label. Like Concord, Ranwood is also distributed by UMG.

The following labels manage different genres:
 Pop, rock, R&B: Geffen
 Jazz: Impulse!, Impulse!/Verve
 Country: Universal Music Group Nashville
 Classical: Deutsche Grammophon
 Musical theater: Decca Broadway

These labels also produce releases from labels absorbed into ABC. For example, MCA Nashville's catalog includes country releases on Dot Records. Deutsche Grammophon's catalog includes the Westminster Records catalog, as well as soundtracks released by Dot and Paramount Records.

See also
 American Broadcasting Company
 List of record labels

References

External links
 The ABC-Paramount Records story

Defunct record labels of the United States
Record labels established in 1955
Record labels disestablished in 1979
American Broadcasting Company
1955 establishments in New York City